Abigail Williams (born c. 1681, date of death unknown) was an 11- or 12-year-old girl who, along with nine-year-old Betty Parris, was among the first of the children to falsely accuse their neighbors of witchcraft in 1692; these accusations eventually led to the Salem witch trials.

Salem Trials
In early 1692, Abigail Williams was living with her relative, Betty Parris' father, the village pastor Samuel Parris, along with his two slaves Tituba and John Indian.

Tituba was part of a group of three women—with Sarah Good and Sarah Osborne—who were the first to be arrested, on February 29, 1692, under the accusation that their spectres (ghosts) were afflicting the young girls in Parris' household. The three women were questioned separately but were aware of each other and, in a classic prisoner's dilemma, they were turned against each other. Sarah Good was the first interrogated and held to her innocence. Judge John Hathorne directed all "the children ... to look upon her and see if this were the person that hurt them ... and they all did look upon her" and claimed her specter tormented them. "Sarah Good ... why do you thus torment these poor children?" Hathorne asked. "What do I know, you bring others here and now you charge me with it," Sarah Good responded. Next Hathorne interrogated Sarah Osbourne, who claimed not to know Sarah Good or even her full name. But Hathorne said to her, "Sarah Good said that it was you that hurt the children." According to the transcript, this is a distortion of what Sarah Good had said, as she had only vaguely referred to the others without naming them, in a way that was only intended to deflect blame from herself. Tituba was interrogated last and was the only of the three women to offer a full and elaborate confession against herself and pointing the finger of blame at the other two women: "Sarah Good and Osbourne would have me hurt the children." According to an investigation by Robert Calef that began soon after the trials, Tituba later recanted her confession as forced and claimed abuse from the slaveowner Parris:

"The account she [Tituba] since gives of it is that her master [Parris] did beat her and otherwise abuse her, to make her confess and accuse, such as he [Parris] called her 'sister-witches' and that whatever she said by way of confessing or accusing others, was the effect of such usage."

Further accusations against many others emerged from the Parris household (and others) and eventually led to the imprisonment of hundreds and the deaths of more than 20 in 1692. Sarah Osborne died in prison in May and Sarah Good was executed on July 19 along with four other women. Members of Parris household all managed to survive the entire episode including Tituba, who was released from jail a year later, when the slaveowner Parris paid her prison fees and sold her.

Later Life 
Nothing is known about Abigail Williams's parentage and origins, and after 1692 Abigail Williams seems to again disappear from the record.

The Crucible
In Arthur Miller's 1953 play, The Crucible, a fictionalized story of the Salem witch trials, Abigail Williams is the name of a character whose age in the play is raised a full five or six years, to age 17, and she is motivated by a desire to be in a relationship with John Proctor, a married farmer with whom she had previously had an affair. In the historical record, there's no evidence of John Proctor and Abigail Williams ever meeting before the trials had started. She was portrayed by Winona Ryder in the 1996 film adaptation of the play.

In popular culture
In John Neal's 1828 novel Rachel Dyer, Abigail Williams appears as the character Bridget Pope. Neal links the origin of the witch hysteria to her sexual development, and her bewitched behavior stems from sexual frustration that is calmed too late when she is reunited with her love interest, Robert Eveleth, after the trials have already begun.

Abigail Williams is an American black metal band formed in 2004.

Abigail appears in the 2010 film The Sorcerer's Apprentice as a minor antagonist. In the film, she was confirmed to be a witch who had both framed and set up others to take the fall for her witchcraft to divert attention from herself, which resulted in the Salem Witch Trials. Her actions and crimes against humanity, coupled with her conspiracy with Horvath to release Morgana, catch the attention of Balthazar Blake, who seals her into the Grimhold so she can do no more harm. She is later released by Horvath to kidnap the main protagonist Dave's love interest, Becky Barnes, only for the former Merlinean to fatally drain her of her magic once she completes the deed.

The 2013 play, Wonders of the Invisible World (originally titled A Discourse on the Wonders of the Invisible World) by Liz Duffy Adams tells the fictional story of Abigail William's return to New England ten years after the witch trials.

Abigail is revealed as the antagonist of the 2014 video game Murdered: Soul Suspect. In the story, flashbacks reveal that she was hanged for her part in the witch trials. Over the centuries, she has existed as a ghost, using her supernatural powers to kill those she believes are witches. In the game's climax, she is seized by demons and dragged to Hell.

Fate/Grand Order, a 2015 online free-to-play role-playing mobile game, has a character under the "Foreigner" class based on both Abigail Williams and Yog-Sothoth. She plays a central role in the plot of the last Pseudo-Singularity chapter, Salem, which takes place during an alternate version of the Salem witch trials.

The 2020 video game Little Hope includes a spin-off of Abigail's history and the Salem witch trials as one of the three timelines.

Convulsive ergotism
In 1976, Linnda R. Caporael put forward the hypothesis that ergot-tainted rye may have been the source of accusations of bewitchment that spurred the Salem witch trials. Caporael argued that many of its convulsive symptoms were all symptoms reported in the Salem witchcraft records. This theory has been refuted by both toxicologists and historians of the Salem witch trials, in part because of the difference in the ages of the core group of accusers, which would have been younger, per prior ergotism epidemics, and would have affected males and females roughly equally. The ergotism theory is critiqued for failing to explain the differences in affliction rates between males and females and that no records suggest the allegedly affected experienced all symptoms to ergotism or had long-term health effects. Additionally, most historical outbreaks of ergotism would affect entire families or communities who shared a similar diet. At the severity of supposed symptoms experienced by accusers, the levels of ergot would have been high enough to cause symptoms in adults in the community.

See also
List of people who disappeared

References

1680s births
1690s missing person cases
1700s deaths
Accusers in witch trials
American children
Colonial American women
Missing person cases in Massachusetts
People of colonial Massachusetts
People of the Salem witch trials